Marlon Mullen (born 1963) is a painter who lives and works in Contra Costa County, California, maintaining a studio practice at NIAD Art Center.

Life
Born in 1963 in Richmond, California, Mullen is autistic and is primarily nonverbal.

Artistic practice
Mullen has maintained his art practice at NIAD (Nurturing Independence through Artistic Development) Art Center in Richmond, CA, since 1993. Mullen makes text-inspired paintings, referencing the graphic design of art magazines such as Artforum.

Solo exhibitions
Mullen has exhibited throughout the United States.
White Columns (2012)
JTT (2015)
Atlanta Contemporary (2015)
Jack Fischer Gallery (2016)
Adams & Ollman (2016)
NIAD (2017)
JTT (2019)
Adams & Ollman (2020)
Massimo De Carlo (2021)

Group exhibitions
After Shelly Duvall '72 at Maccarone (2011)
Create at Berkeley Art Museum & Pacific Film Archive (2011)
Color and Form at Jack Fischer Gallery in San Francisco (2013)
Under Another Name, organized by Thomas J. Lax at the Studio Museum in Harlem (2014)
NADA Art Fair in Miami with White Columns (2014)
Way Bay 2 at Berkeley Art Museum & Pacific Film Archive (2018)
Whitney Biennial (2019) - curated by Rujeko Hockley and Jane Panetta
SECA 2019 at The San Francisco Museum of Modern Art (2020)
Image Power at The Frans Hals Museum (2020)

Awards
Wynn Newhouse Award (2015)
SFMOMA SECA Award (2019)

Public collections 

 Museum of Modern Art - New York, NY
 Whitney Museum of American Art - New York, NY
 Berkeley Art Museum - Berkeley, CA
 Portland Art Museum - Portland, OR
 Institute of Contemporary Art, Miami - Miami, FL
 High Museum of Art - Atlanta,GA
 MADMusée - Belgium
 RISD Museum - Providence, RI
 San Francisco Museum of Modern Art -San Francisco, CA
 Studio Museum in Harlem - New York, NY

References

External links
Marlon Mullen - JTT

1963 births
Living people
21st-century American artists
Artists with disabilities
American people with disabilities
African-American painters
Autism in the arts
Mute people
American contemporary painters
21st-century African-American artists
20th-century African-American people